The 2001 South American Cross Country Championships took place on March 3–4, 2001.  The races were held in Rio de Janeiro, Brazil.

Complete results, results for junior and youth competitions, and medal winners were published.

Medallists

Race results

Senior men's race (12 km)

Note: Athletes in parentheses did not score for the team result.

Men's short race (4 km)

Note: Athletes in parentheses did not score for the team result.

Junior (U20) men's race (8 km)

Note: Athletes in parentheses did not score for the team result.

Youth (U18) men's race (4 km)

Note: Athletes in parentheses did not score for the team result.

Senior women's race (8 km)

Note: Athletes in parentheses did not score for the team result.

Women's short race (4 km)

Note: Athletes in parentheses did not score for the team result.

Junior (U20) women's race (6 km)

Note: Athletes in parentheses did not score for the team result.

Youth (U18) women's race (3 km)

Note: Athletes in parentheses did not score for the team result.

Medal table (unofficial)

Note: Totals include both individual and team medals, with medals in the team competition counting as one medal.

Participation
According to an unofficial count, 88 athletes (+ 114 local athletes) from 9 countries participated.

 (8)
 (4)
 (46+114 local)
 (8)
 (3)
 (8)
 (7)
 Perú (2)
 (2)

See also
 2001 in athletics (track and field)

References

External links
 GBRathletics

South American Cross Country Championships
South American Cross Country Championships
South American Cross Country Championships
South American Cross Country Championships
South American Cross Country Championships
Cross country running in Brazil
2000s in Rio de Janeiro
Athletics in Rio de Janeiro (city)
March 2001 sports events in South America